Olimpia Coral Melo (born in Huauchinango, Puebla in 1988) is a Mexican activist recognized as one of the 100 most influential people in the world in 2021 by Time magazine. She promoted the creation of a law against digital harassment in Mexico that takes her name, the Olimpia Law.
After suffering "revenge porn" by an ex-partner who released a sex video of her without her consent, she began a seven-year struggle to create and promote a law that would criminalize these practices.

Activist 
In her youth, her affectionate partner disclosed a private video with sexual content that quickly went viral in Mexico. This episode had emotional effects on Olimpia, who fell into depression and attempted suicide, as she has mentioned in interviews. As a result, she founded the organization Mujeres contra la violencia de género in Puebla and later moved to Mexico City to found, together with other women, the Frente Nacional para la Sororidad, to prevent virtual violence and accompany women who had experienced it.

In March 2014, when she was 19 years old, she filed a bill in the Puebla Congress. After her advocacy, she succeeded in having digital violence recognized. In 2018, she managed to get punished those who share intimate materials without consent, with up to six years in prison. Since then 28 states of the Mexican Republic recognize this crime. On January 22, 2020, Mexico City joined these entities by publishing it in its Official Gazette.

In 2019, when the law had only been passed in 11 states in Mexico, she told her story to BBC Mundo:People have no idea what creates that kind of violence. They limit your freedom, your privacy, your mobility, your life. And you accept it because you believe you are guilty. That's why access to justice is almost impossible. Every "like" to those publications is an aggression, every "like" is a blow. Every time someone shares intimate content of a person who did not allow it is like a rape.

National Sorority Front 
Olimpia Coral Melo founded the Frente Nacional para la Sororidad, a collective whose first objective was to provide support to women living with digital violence. Later, it began to group independent feminists and collectives to have a presence in various Mexican states. Currently, the Front has a specific group of defenders of victims of violence on the Internet, which also provides legal and psychological assistance and support.

References 

1988 births
Living people
Anti-cyberbullying activists
Mexican feminists
People from Huauchinango